Rivne, also known as Rovno, is a city in western Ukraine. The city is the administrative center of Rivne Oblast (province), as well as the surrounding Rivne Raion (district created in the USSR) within the oblast. Administratively, Rivne is incorporated as a city of oblast significance and does not belong to the raion. It has a population of 

Between World War I and World War II, the city was located in Poland as a district-level (county) seat in Wolyn Voivodeship. At the start of World War II in 1939, Rivne was occupied by the Soviet Red Army and received its current status by becoming a seat of regional government of the Rivne Oblast which was created out of the eastern portion of the voivodeship. During the German occupation of 1941–44 the city was designated as a capital of German Ukraine (Reichskommissariat Ukraine). In the spring of 1919, it also served as a provisional seat of the Ukrainian government throughout the ongoing war with Soviet Russia.

Rivne is an important transportation hub, with the international Rivne Airport, and rail links to Zdolbuniv, Sarny, and Kovel, as well as highways linking it with Brest, Kyiv and Lviv. Among other leading companies there is a chemical factory of Rivne-Azot (part of Ostchem Holding).

History

Middle Ages
Rivne was first mentioned in 1283 in the Polish annals "Rocznik kapituły krakowskiej" as one of the inhabited places of Halych-Volhynia near which Leszek II the Black was victorious over a part of the Grand Ducal Lithuanian Army. Following the Kingdom of Galicia–Volhynia's partition after Galicia–Volhynia Wars in the late 14th century, it was under the rule of Grand Duchy of Lithuania and in 1434 the Grand Duke of Lithuania Švitrigaila awarded the settlement to a Lutsk nobleman Dychko. In 1461 Dychko sold his settlement to Prince Semen Nesvizh. In 1479 Semen Nesvizh died and his settlement was passed to his wife Maria who started to call herself princess of Rivne. She turned the settlement into a princely residence by building in 1481 a castle on one of local river islands and managed to obtain Magdeburg rights for the settlement in 1492 from the King of Poland Casimir IV Jagiellon. Following her death in 1518, the city was passed on to the princes of Ostrog and declined by losing its status as a princely residency.

In 1566 the town of Rivne became part of newly established Volhynian Voivodeship. Following the Union of Lublin in 1569, it was transferred from the realm of the Grand Duchy of Lithuania to the Crown of Poland. The city had a status of privately held by nobles (Ostrogski and Lubomirski families). Following the Second Partition of Poland in 1793 Rivne became a part of the Russian Empire, and in 1797 it was declared to be a county level (uyezd) town of the Volhynian Governorate.

World War I
During World War I and the period of chaos shortly after, it was briefly under German, Ukrainian, Bolshevik and Polish rule. During April–May 1919 Rivne served as the temporary capital of the Ukrainian People's Republic. In late April 1919 one of the Ukrainian military leaders Volodymyr Oskilko attempted to organize a coup-d'état against the Directorate led by Symon Petliura and the cabinet of Borys Martos and replace them with Yevhen Petrushevych as president of Ukraine. In Rivne, Oskilko managed to arrest most of the cabinet ministers including Martos himself, but Petliura at that time was in neighboring Zdolbuniv and managed to stop Oskilko's efforts. At the conclusion of the conflict, in accordance with the Riga Peace Treaty of 1921 it became a part of Polish Volhynian Voivodeship, a situation which would last until the Second World War. Before World War II, Rivne (Równe) was a mainly Jewish-Polish city (Jews constituted about 50% of the city's population, and Poles 35%). When Jews died during the Holocaust, Poles from Rivne were deported to Poland's new borders after 1945.

World War II
In 1939, as a result of the Molotov–Ribbentrop Pact and the partition of Poland, Rivne was occupied by the Soviet Union. From December of the same year Rivne became the center of the newly established Rivne Oblast, within the Ukrainian SSR.

On 28 June 1941 Rivne was invaded by the 6th army of Nazi Germany. On August 20, the Nazis declared it the administrative center of Reichskommissariat Ukraine. A prison for the Gestapo was opened on Belaia Street. In November 8-13, German actor Olaf Bach was flown to the city to perform for the German forces. Roughly half of Rivne's inhabitants were Jewish. On November 6-8, 17,500 Jewish adults from Rivne were shot to death or thrown alive into a large pit in a pine grove in Sosenki. 6,000 Jewish children suffered the same fate at a nearby site. The city's remaining Jews were sent to the Rivne Ghetto. The ghetto was subsequently liquidated.

On 2 February 1944, the city was captured by the Red Army in the Battle of Rivne, and remained under Soviet control until Ukraine regained its independence on the break-up of the USSR in 1991.

Post-war era
In 1958, a TV tower began broadcasting in the city; in 1969, the first trolley ran through the city; in 1969, Rivne airport was opened. In 1983, the city celebrated its 700th anniversary.

On 11 June 1991, the Ukrainian parliament officially renamed the city Rivne according to the rules of Ukrainian orthography, whereas it had previously been known as Rovno.

In 1992, a memorial complex of 20 thousand square meters was established at the site of the World War II massacre to commemorate the killing of 17,500 Jews there in November 1941 during the Holocaust, commemorating the mass grave with an obelisk inscribed in Yiddish, Hebrew and Ukrainian.

On 6 June 2012, the World War II Jewish burial site was vandalised, allegedly as part of an antisemitic act.

Russo-Ukrainian War
On March 14, 2022, Rivne TV Tower has experienced heavy missile attack by Russian troops. The tower was damaged and an administrative room was destroyed. As a result of attack 20 people were killed and nine injured.

On June 25, 2022, 4 people were killed by a Russian missile attack in Sarny.

Climate
Rivne has a moderate continental climate with cold, snowy winters and warm summers. Snow cover usually lasts from November until March. The average annual precipitation is  June and July being the wettest months and January and February the driest.

Industry

During Soviet times the provincial town was transformed into an industrial center of the republic. There were two significant factories built. The first was a machine building and metal processing factory capable of producing high-voltage apparatus, tractor spare parts and others. The other was a chemical factory and synthetic materials fabrication plant. Light industry, including a linen plant and a textile mill, as well as food industries, including milk and meat processing plants and a vegetable preservation plant, have also been built. In addition the city became a production center for furniture and other building materials.

Landmarks

As an important cultural center, Rivne hosts a humanities and a hydro-engineering university, as well as a faculty of the Kyiv State Institute of Culture, and medical and musical as well as automobile-construction, commercial, textile, agricultural and cooperative polytechnic colleges. The city has a historical museum.

Following the fall of the Soviet Union, the monument for the Soviet hero Dmitry Medvedev was removed, and the Nikolai Kuznetsov monument was moved to another location within the city. Instead, in order to reflect the controversial history of the region the monuments for "People who died in the honor of Ukraine", and "Soldiers who died in local military battles" were installed.

Buildings
Church of the Assumption (1756)
Cathedral of the Intercession (2001)
Cathedral of the Ascension (1890)
A classicism-style gymnasium building (1839)
During Soviet times the center of the city from Lenin street to Peace Avenue (1963 architects R.D. Vais and O.I. Filipchuk) was completely rebuilt with Administrative and Public buildings in neo-classical, Stalinist style.

Memorials
The following memorials are found in Rivne:
Monument to the 25th Anniversary of the Liberation of Rivne from the Fascists, Mlynivs'ke Highway
Monument to the Victims of Fascism, Bila Street Square (1968, by A.I. Pirozhenko and B.V. Rychkov, architect-V.M.Gerasimenko)
Bust on the Tomb of Partisan M. Strutyns'ka and Relief on the Tomb of Citizens S. Yelentsia and S. Kotiyevs'koho, Kniazia Volodymyra Street, Hrabnyk Cemetery
Monument to the Perished of Ukraine, Magdeburz'koho Prava Plaza
Communal Grave of Warriors, Soborna Street
Monument of Eternal Glory, Kyivs'ka Street
Monument to Taras Shevchenko, T.G. Shevchenko Park; Statue on Nezalezhnosti Plaza
Memorial to Warriors' Glory, Dubens'ka Street, Rivne Military Cemetery (1975, by M.L. Farina, architect-N.A. Dolgansky)
Monument to the Warrior and the Partisan, Peremohy Plaza (1948 by I.Ya. Matveenko)
Monument to Colonel Klym Savura, Commander of the Ukrainian People's Army, Soborna Street
Monument to Symon Petliura, Symon Petliura Street
Monument to N.I. Kuznetsov (bronze and granite, 1961 by V.P Vinaikin)
Monument to the Jewish Victims of the Holocaust - mass grave site (ca. 1991)The memorial was desecrated on June 8, 2012 by breaking parts of it and spraying swastikas. The teenagers in charge of the antisemitic action were caught and trialed.
Monument to the victims of the Chernobyl disaster, Simon Petliura Street
Statue and Plaza dedicated to Maria Rivnens'ka, Soborna Street

Popular culture references
In his memoir A Tale of Love and Darkness, Israeli author Amos Oz describes Rivne through the memories of his mother and her family, who grew up in the city before emigrating to Israel in the 1930s.
Rivne was mentioned several times in The Tale of the Nightly Neighbors, a 1992 episode of the Canadian-American TV show Are You Afraid of the Dark?, being referred to by a variation of its pre-1991 name (either Ravno or Rovno).
In Leonard Bernstein's operetta Candide, the character of The Old Lady sings an aria "I am easily assimilated", in which she refers to her father having been born in Rovno Gubernya

Notable people

Anna Belfer-Cohen (born 1949), Israeli archaeologist and paleoanthropologist
Dahn Ben-Amotz (1924–1989), Israeli radio broadcaster, journalist, playwright and author 
Ancestors of Leonard Bernstein (1918–1990), the American composer include his father, Samuel, who was born in Berezdiv and his mother, Jennie, born in Sheptevoka in the Rovno region. In Bernstein's operetta Candide, the character of The Old Lady sings an aria, "I am easily assimilated", in which she refers to her father as having been born in Rovno Gubernya
Zuzanna Ginczanka,(1917–1945), Polish poet of the interwar period.
Erast Huculak (1930–2013), Canadian businessman, public figure and philanthropist 
Artem Kachanovskyi (born 1992), 2-dan professional Go player, three-time European Champion, Editor-in-chief of the European Go Journal.
Jan Kobylański (1923–2019), Polish-Paraguayan businessman, founder of the Union of Polish Associations and Organizations in Latin America
Sophie Irene Loeb (1876–1929), American journalist and social welfare advocate
Yuriy Lutsenko (born 1964),  politician and Prosecutor General of Ukraine, 2016 to 2019.
Oksana Markarova (born 1976), Minister of Finance, 2018 to 2020 and diplomat.
Natalya Pasichnyk (born 1971),  Swedish-Ukrainian classical pianist, she lives in Stockholm.
Olga Pasichnyk (born 1968), Polish-Ukrainian classical soprano singer, she lives in Poland.
Stanisław Albrecht Radziwiłł (1914–1976) Polish nobleman, a scion of the House of Radziwiłł
Shmuel Shoresh (1913–1981), Israeli politician, member of the Knesset from 1955 until 1969.
Boris Smolar (1897–1986), American journalist and newspaper editor
Mira Spivak (born 1934), member of the Senate of Canada representing Manitoba
Anna Walentynowicz (1929–2010), Polish free trade union activist and co-founder of Solidarity
Brenda Weisberg (1900–1996), Russian-American screenwriter of monster movies, thrillers & family films
Wladimir Wertelecki (born 1936), pediatrician, medical geneticist and teratologist in the US
Yaroslav Yevdokimov (born 1946), baritone singer.
Vsevolod Zaderatsky (1891–1953), Russian Imperial and Ukrainian Soviet composer, pianist and teacher
Yana Zinkevych (born 1995), Ukrainian member of parliament and military veteran 
Moishe Zilberfarb (1876-1934),  Ukrainian politician, diplomat, and public activist

Sport 
Serhiy Honchar (born 1970), professional road racing cyclist
Serhiy Lishchuk (born 1982), basketball player, Valencia BC legend, nicknamed "the Ukraine Train"
Mykhailo Romanchuk (born 1996), swimmer, silver & bronze medallst at the 2020 Summer Olympics
Viktor Trofimov (1938–2013), former Soviet international speedway rider
Alla Tsuper (born 1979), Ukrainian and Belarusian aerial skier and gold medallist at the 2014 Winter Olympics

International relations

Twin towns – Sister cities
Rivne is twinned with:

 Vidin in Bulgaria
 Kobuleti in Georgia
 Oberviechtach in Germany
 Gdańsk in Poland
 Lublin in Poland
 Piotrków Trybunalski in Poland
 Radomsko County in Poland
 Zabrze in Poland
 Zvolen in Slovakia
 Federal Way in the United States
 East Brunswick, New Jersey in the United States

Sport

Rugby
RC Rivne (1999)

Gallery

See also
Rivne Ukrainian Gymnasium
History of the Jews in Ukraine

Notes

References

Maps
 Рівне, план міста, 1:12000. Міста України. Картографія.
infomisto.com — map of the Rivne, information and reference portal.

External links

Official website of Rivne City Council and Rivne City Administration  
Rivne Bird webcam 
Rivne Places of Interest 
Rowno, a Memorial to the Jewish Community of Rowno, Volyn (Rivne, Ukraine) 
The Jewish Community of Rivne, The Museum of the Jewish People at Beit Hatfutsot 

 
Cities in Rivne Oblast
Volhynian Voivodeship (1569–1795)
Rovensky Uyezd
Wołyń Voivodeship (1921–1939)
Shtetls
Cities of regional significance in Ukraine
Holocaust locations in Ukraine
Oblast centers in Ukraine